Robert Joseph Hervé Rivard (August 1, 1939 – January 1, 2023) was a Canadian professional ice hockey player. He played in 27 games with the Pittsburgh Penguins during the 1967–68 NHL season.

References

External links

1939 births
2023 deaths
French Quebecers
Canadian ice hockey forwards
Baltimore Clippers players
Canadian ice hockey centres
Fort Wayne Komets players
Sportspeople from Sherbrooke
Indianapolis Chiefs players
Pittsburgh Penguins players
Toledo Mercurys players
Peterborough Petes (ice hockey) players
Quebec Aces (AHL) players
Ice hockey people from Quebec
Canadian expatriate ice hockey players in the United States